The Human Space Flight Centre (HSFC) is a body under the Indian Space Research Organisation (ISRO) to coordinate the Indian Human Spaceflight Programme. The agency will be responsible for implementation of the Gaganyaan project. The first crewed flight is planned for 2024 on a home-grown GSLV-III rocket.

Before Gaganyaan mission announcement in August 2018, human spaceflight was not the priority for ISRO, though most of the required capability for it had been realised. ISRO has already developed most of the technologies for crewed flight and it performed a Crew Module Atmospheric Re-entry Experiment and a Pad Abort Test for the mission. The project will cost less than Rs. 10,000 crore. In December 2018, the government approved further  100 billion (US$1.5 billion) for a 7-days crewed flight of 3 astronauts to take place in December 2021, later delayed to 2023.

If completed on schedule, India will become  world's fourth nation to conduct independent human spaceflight after the Soviet Union/Russia, United States and People's Republic of China. After conducting crewed spaceflights, the agency also intends to continue with efforts with a space station program and possibly a crewed lunar landing.

History 

The trials for crewed space missions began in 2007 with the 600 kg Space Capsule Recovery Experiment (SRE), launched using the Polar Satellite Launch Vehicle (PSLV) rocket, and safely returned to earth 12 days later.

Defence Food Research Laboratory (DFRL) has worked on the space food for crewed spaceflight and has been conducting trials on G-suit for astronauts as well. A prototype  'Advanced Crew Escape Suit' weighing 13 kg was built by Sure Safety (India) Limited based on ISRO's requirements has been tested and performance verified.

The testing phase is expected to begin from 2022 and the mission will be undertaken by 2023.

Spacecraft development 

The first phase of this programme is to develop and fly the 3.7-ton spaceship called Gaganyaan that will carry a 3-member crew to low Earth orbit and safely return to Earth after a mission duration of a few orbits to two days. The first uncrewed launch is planned for 2022. The extendable version of the spaceship will allow flights up to seven days, rendezvous and docking capability.

Enhancements in spacecraft will lead to development of a space habitat allowing spaceflight duration of 30–40 days at once in next phase. Further advances from experience will subsequently lead to development of a space station.

On 7 October 2016, Vikram Sarabhai Space Centre Director K. Sivan stated that ISRO was gearing up to conduct a critical 'crew bailout test' called ISRO Pad Abort Test to see how fast and effectively the crew module could be released safely in the event of an emergency. The tests were conducted successfully on 5 July 2018 at Satish Dhawan Space Centre, Sriharikota. This was the first test in a series of tests to qualify a crew escape system technology.

India will not use any animals for life support systems testing but robots resembling humans will be used. ISRO is targeting more than 99.8% reliability for its crew escape system.

As of August 2018, ISRO plans to launch its crewed orbiter Gaganyaan atop a Geosynchronous Satellite Launch Vehicle Mk III (GSLV Mk III). About 16 minutes after lift-off, the rocket will inject the orbital vehicle into an orbit 300 to 400 km above Earth. The capsule would return for a splashdown in the Arabian Sea near the Gujarat coastline. As of May 2019, design of crew module has been completed. The spacecraft will be flown twice uncrewed for validation before conducting actual human spaceflight.

Infrastructure development

Human-Rating of GSLV 
Human-rating rates the system is capable of safely transporting humans. ISRO will be building and launching 2 missions to validate the human rating of the GSLV-MK III. Existing launch facilities will be upgraded to enable them to carry out launches under Indian Human Spaceflight campaign.

Escape System 
The escape system will boast of a recently included geometry. Work on parachute enlargement and new architecture are also going on.

Astronaut training

Training for Gaganyaan programme

ISRO Chairman, K. Sivan, announced in January 2019 the creation of India's Human Space Flight Centre in Bangalore for training astronauts, also called vyomanauts (vyoma means 'Space' or 'Sky' in Sanskrit). The  centre will train the selected astronauts in rescue and recovery operations, operate in zero gravity environment, and monitoring of the radiation environment.

In spring 2009 a full-scale mock-up of the crew capsule was built and delivered to Satish Dhawan Space Centre for training of astronauts. India will be short listing 200 Indian Air Force pilots for this purpose. The selection process would begin by the candidates having to complete an ISRO questionnaire, after which they would be subjected to physical and psychological analyses. Only 4 of the 200 applicants will be selected for the first space mission training. While two will fly, two shall act as reserve.

ISRO signed a memorandum of understanding in 2009 with the Indian Air Force's Institute of Aerospace Medicine (IAM) to conduct preliminary research on psychological and physiological needs of crew and development of training facilities. ISRO is also discussing an agreement with Russia regarding some aspects of astronaut training.

Human Space Flight Centre and Glavcosmos, which is a subsidiary of the Russian state corporation Roscosmos, signed an agreement on 1 July 2019 for cooperation in the selection, support, medical examination and space training of Indian astronauts. An ISRO Technical Liaison Unit (ITLU) will be set up in Moscow to facilitate the development of some key technologies and establishment of special facilities which are essential to support life in space.

As of January 2020, 4 crews have been selected for the mission with astronaut training scheduled to begin in third week of January.

Planned facilities within India 

An astronaut training facility will be established on proposed site of  nearby Kempegowda International Airport in Devanahalli, Karnataka.

Another such facility is proposed to be constructed in Challakere under a  plan. It will be a facility spanning  and will be the primary facility for astronaut training and other related activities. As of January 2020, it is planned to be completed in 3 years. Once completed, all activities related to the Indian Human Spaceflight Programme will be undertaken there.

Experiments and objectives 

On 7 November 2018, ISRO released an Announcement of Opportunity seeking proposals from the Indian science community for microgravity experiments that could be carried out during the first two robotic flights of Gaganyaan. The scope of the experiments is not restricted, and other relevant ideas will be entertained. The proposed orbit for microgravity platform is expected to be in an Earth-bound orbit at approximately 400 km altitude. All the proposed internal and external experimental payloads will undergo thermal, vacuum and radiation tests under required temperature and pressure conditions. To carry out microgravity experiments for long duration, a satellite may be placed in orbit.

See also
Indian Human Spaceflight Programme
Indian Space Research Organization

References

External links 
President Kalam's vision: India will land on the Moon in August 2025
Hindustan Aeronautics Ltd (HAL) hands over the first ‘Crew Module Structural Assembly’ to ISRO. 13 February 2014.

Indian Space Research Organisation
2019 establishments in Karnataka
Transport in Bangalore
Human spaceflight programs